Thompson Orville "Mickey" Livingston (November 15, 1914 – April 3, 1983) was an American professional baseball catcher. He served in the United States Army during World War II, missing the  season.

Livingston began his professional career at age 22 in 1937 after playing semipro baseball in South Carolina's textile leagues. He made his MLB debut the following season, on September 17, 1938, by collecting three hits in four at bats, including a double, as his Senators outlasted the St. Louis Browns 10–9 at Sportsman's Park. 

Much of Livingston's decade-long big-league tenure was spent as a backup catcher, although he was the 1943 Cubs' regular receiver (starting in 100 games) and the pennant-winning 1945 Cubs' most-used backstop, starting in 64 regular-season contests and catching 541 innings. Livingston followed that by starting six of the seven games at catcher for the Cubs in the 1945 World Series. He had eight hits in 22 at bats (.364), including three doubles. Chicago went 3–3 in those six games, including the decisive Game 7, which the Cubs dropped to the Series champion Detroit Tigers.

Livingston was a teammate of Jackie Robinson on the 1951 Brooklyn Dodgers. He played for the last time on September 20 and did not appear in the tie-breaker postseason series,  which ended October 3, 1951, with the "Shot Heard 'Round the World" pennant-winning home run by the Giants' Bobby Thomson. From 1952 to 1956, Livingston was a player-manager in the minor leagues.

During his 561-game MLB playing career, Livingston batted .238. His 354 hits included 56 doubles, nine triples and 19 home runs, with 153 runs batted in.

References

External links

1914 births
1983 deaths
Baseball players from South Carolina
Beaumont Exporters players
Boise Braves players
Boston Braves players
Brooklyn Dodgers players
Charlotte Hornets (baseball) players
Chattanooga Lookouts players
Chicago Cubs players
Colorado Springs Sky Sox managers
Colorado Springs Sky Sox (WL) players
Fort Worth Cats players
Lubbock Hubbers players
Major League Baseball catchers
New York Giants (NL) players
People from Newberry, South Carolina
Philadelphia Phillies players
St. Paul Saints (AA) players
Sanford Lookouts players
Shreveport Sports players
Springfield Nationals players
Texas City Texans players
Trenton Senators players
United States Army personnel of World War II
Washington Senators (1901–1960) players